The Rainbow Range is a small subrange of the Park Ranges subdivisions of the Northern Continental Ranges of the Rocky Mountains on the border between Alberta and British Columbia in Mount Robson Provincial Park.

Its highest summit, and the highest in the Canadian Rockies, is Mount Robson , followed by nearby Resplendent Mountain 3425 m (11241 ft) and Mount Kain 2863 m (9393 ft).

See also
 Ranges of the Canadian Rockies

References

External links
 Bivouac - Rainbow Range

Ranges of the Canadian Rockies
Mountain ranges of British Columbia
Robson Valley